Samuel Powell (July 10, 1776 – August 2, 1841), was an American politician who represented Tennessee in the United States House of Representatives.

Biography
Powell was born in Norristown, Pennsylvania. He attended the common schools and Philadelphia College, studied law, and was admitted to bar in Norristown prior to 1800.

Career
In 1800, Powell moved to Blountville, Tennessee, where he established the first law school in Tennessee at his home since he was new to the area and needed to establish a following. He married  Mary Rutledge, daughter of General George Rutledge, a prominent citizen of Sullivan County. In 1805, he moved to Rogersville, Tennessee and practiced law. From 1807 to 1809, he served as a member of the superior court of law and equity. He was a judge of the first circuit court of Tennessee in 1812–1813. He was a law mentor to future attorney and state politician John Netherland.

Powell was elected as a Democratic-Republican to the Fourteenth Congress, which lasted from March 4, 1815 to March 3, 1817.   He was not a candidate for renomination in 1816.

After departing Congress, Powell resumed the practice of law, and he was again a judge of the first circuit court of Tennessee from 1819 to 1841.

Death
Powell died in Rogersville, Tennessee, on August 2, 1841 at age 65, and is interred at the Old Presbyterian Cemetery.

References

1776 births
1841 deaths
People from Rogersville, Tennessee
People from Norristown, Pennsylvania
People of colonial Pennsylvania
Democratic-Republican Party members of the United States House of Representatives from Tennessee
People from Blountville, Tennessee
Burials in Tennessee